The New London Graduate School was a consortium of five partner universities: Anglia Ruskin University, Greenwich University, The University of East London, Middlesex University and London South Bank University. The NLGS offered Arts and Humanities Research Council (AHRC) funding to postgraduate applicants at these universities and provided seminars and training opportunities to all postgraduate students at these universities.

The consortium was chaired by Dr Alan White of UEL and subsequently Anglia Ruskin University.

History 

The New London Graduate School (NLGS) was formed in November 2009 when the universities of East London, Greenwich, London Metropolitan, London South Bank and Middlesex University applied to the Economic and Social Research Council (ESRC) for recognition as a Doctoral Training Unit (DTU).  Although this application was unsuccessful, the five universities continued their proposed programme.

In January 2011, they received funding from the Arts and Humanities Research Council (AHRC) for a Block Grant Partnership: Capacity Building (BGP:CB) award. The University of East London was the formal 'managing institution' for the grant funds, and NLGS administration was also based there.

In December 2011, London Metropolitan University decided to leave the consortium. Also in December 2011, Anglia Ruskin University joined the consortium, which kept the NLGS name despite the addition of a partner located in Essex and Cambridgeshire.

In 2015, following an unsuccessful application to the AHRC for a further tranche of BGP funding, and the decision by the ESRC to focus on larger Doctoral Training Centres (DTCs) rather than DTUs in the continuation of their postgraduate research funding arrangements, the five consortium members decided to end the collaboration.

References

 

College and university associations and consortia in the United Kingdom
New London Graduate School